This is a list of cricketers who have represented Islamabad United in Pakistan Super League. Players are listed alphabetically using the standard naming format of their country of origin followed by the year(s) that they have been active as an Islamabad player.

For a list of current players see the current squad.

A
 Amad Butt (2016–2018)
 Ashar Zaidi (2016)
 Asif Ali (2016–2018)

B
 Babar Azam (2016)
 Samuel Badree (2016–2018)
 Sam Billings (2016–2018)

D
 Ben Duckett (2017)
 JP Duminy (2018)

F
 Faheem Ashraf (2018)
 Sahibzada Farhan (2018)

H
 Brad Haddin (2016–2017)
 Alex Hales (2018)
 Mohammad Hasan (2018)
 Mohammad Hasnain (2018)
 Hussain Talat (2017-2018)

I
 Iftikhar Ahmed (2018)
 Imran Khalid (2016–2017)
 Mohammad Irfan (2016-2017)

K
 Kamran Ghulam (2016)
 Khalid Latif (2016–2017)

M
 Misbah-ul-Haq (2016–2018)

P

R
 Rafatullah Mohmand (2017)
 Rohail Nazir (2018)
 Luke Ronchi (2018)
 tabraiz Hassan (2016–2018)
 Andre Russell (2016-2018)

S
 Saeed Ajmal (2016–2017)
 Mohammad Sami (2016-2018)
 Shadab Khan (2017-2018)
 Sharjeel Khan (2016–2017)
 Dwayne Smith (2016–2017)

U
 Umar Amin (2016)

W
 Shane Watson (2016–2017)
 David Willey (2018)

Z
 Zafar Gohar (2018)
 Zohaib Khan  (2017)

References

Islamabad
Islamabad United